The effects of the 1928 Okeechobee hurricane in Florida included at least 2,500 fatalities in the state, making this the second deadliest tropical cyclone on record in the contiguous United States, behind only the 1900 Galveston hurricane, as well as the deadliest weather event on the entire east coast. The storm originated from a tropical depression that developed near Dakar, Senegal, on September 6. Traversing westward across the Atlantic Ocean, the cyclone struck the Lesser Antilles, Puerto Rico, and the Bahamas as a powerful hurricane. Early on September 17, the storm made landfall near Palm Beach, Florida, as a Category 4 hurricane on the modern-day Saffir–Simpson hurricane wind scale. After initially moving northwestward across Florida, the cyclone curved north-northeastward near the Tampa Bay area. The hurricane briefly re-emerged into the Atlantic prior to striking South Carolina on September 18 and becoming extratropical over North Carolina on the next day, before the remnants lost their identity over Ontario on September 21.

Along the east coast of Florida, the most extensive damage occurred between Miami and Fort Pierce, particularly in Palm Beach County. In West Palm Beach, one of the most severely affected coastal cities, a total of 1,711 houses were destroyed and 6,369 others suffered damage, which left about 2,100 families homeless. Additionally, the hurricane demolished 268 businesses and affected 490 others. The city reported four deaths and severe damage totaling just under $13.8 million (1928 USD). In nearby Palm Beach, which has many dwellings owned by wealthy individuals, approximately 1,500 houses and 500 businesses suffered damage, while the town reported damage totaling about $10 million. Inland, strong winds pushed water from the shallow Lake Okeechobee above the small dikes and into surrounding areas. The storm swept away or destroyed many structures and drowned at least 2,500 people, most of whom were black farmer workers. Overall, damage totaled at least $25 million, while Governor John W. Martin estimated that the hurricane left approximately 15,000 families homeless in Palm Beach County alone.

In the immediate aftermath of the storm, individuals and organizations across the United States assisted with relief efforts, especially the American Red Cross, which obtained almost $5.9 million in monetary donations. Racial segregation laws at the time resulted in many white victims receiving a proper burial at Woodlawn Cemetery in West Palm Beach. However, those collecting and transporting bodies either burned or mass buried black victims or those of an unknown race, especially at the Port Mayaca Cemetery and a pauper's cemetery in West Palm Beach. An already faltering economy in Florida as the land boom ended fell into turmoil even before the Wall Street Crash of 1929 and the Great Depression began. The regions worst impacted by the storm did not experience a significant economic rebound until the United States entered World War II. To prevent a similar disaster from occurring again in the communities surrounding Lake Okeechobee, construction of the Herbert Hoover Dike began in 1930. The mass burial site at the pauper's cemetery in West Palm Beach remained unmarked until 2003, the 75th anniversary of the hurricane.

Background

A tropical depression developed almost immediately offshore the west coast of Africa on September 6, just south of Dakar, Senegal. The depression strengthened into a tropical storm later that day, shortly before passing south of the Cape Verde Islands. Further intensification was slow and halted by late on September 7. However, about 48 hours later, the storm resumed strengthening and became a Category 1 hurricane on the modern-day Saffir–Simpson hurricane wind scale. The system reached Category 4 intensity before striking Guadeloupe on September 12. About six hours later, the system made landfall in Puerto Rico; it remains the only tropical cyclone known to have struck the island as a Category 5 hurricane. After emerging into the Atlantic, the storm weakened slightly, falling to Category 4 intensity. Continuing west-northwestward, the hurricane then traversed the Bahamas between September 15 and September 16.

While crossing Florida, the system weakened significantly, falling to Category 1 intensity late on September 17 just north of the Tampa Bay area. Early on the following day, the system weakened to a tropical storm and transitioned into an extratropical cyclone over North Carolina hours later. The remnants moved northwestward across the Mid-Atlantic region, before dissipating over Ontario on September 21.

After World War I, South Florida experienced a land boom, which brought new construction and large population increases, including the quadrupling of West Palm Beach's population between 1920 and 1927. A New York Times article from 1925 noted that the development in Florida "yields no parallel". However, the land boom began faltering after the 1926 Miami hurricane and real estate scams. In contrast to the quickly-growing coastal areas, the communities along the shore of Lake Okeechobee more closely resembled an agrarian society, with agricultural productivity rapidly taking hold in the area due to the rich, black muck soil. A 1945 report published in the St. Louis Post-Dispatch estimated that approximately 5,000 migrant farm workers resided in this region at the time of the 1928 hurricane, many of whom lodged in shacks and tents.

A mud dike averaging only  in height surrounded Lake Okeechobee prior to the 1928 hurricane. The southwest side of this dike had been breached during the 1926 Miami hurricane, devastating Clewiston and Moore Haven and drowning as many as 300 people. State chief engineer Fred C. Elliott recognized at least since 1920 that a levee should be erected along the shore of Lake Okeechobee to prevent flooding, while attempts by the Florida Legislature to secure authorization and funding for flood control around Lake Okeechobee dated back to 1924. However, Congressman Herbert J. Drane noted little had been done to mitigate a disaster similar to the 1926 hurricane, despite "an attempt ... to interest the Federal government in the reclamation of the Everglades and particularly in providing protection against such storms as had occurred.", according to proceedings of the Soil Science Society of Florida.

Preceding the storm of 1928, drier than normal weather conditions existed through much of 1927 and 1928, which led to muck fires.

Preparations
In the days prior to the storm, several forecasters declared that there was virtually no chance of the hurricane making landfall in Florida. Richard W. Gray, chief meteorologist at the Weather Bureau office in Miami, predicted on September 12 that the storm would move westward and eventually dissipate over the Yucatán Channel. However, the hurricane instead moved northwestward after striking Puerto Rico. On September 14, a newspaper noted that there "seemed to be a tendency toward a curve east-ward," meaning that a landfall in Florida was highly unlikely. A. J. Mitchell of the Jacksonville Weather Bureau office stated that "the storm no longer threatens the lower East Coast of Florida.", while Gray declared it "improbable that it [the hurricane] will affect the east coast of Florida." Mariano Gutiérrez-Lanza of the Jesuit observatory in Belen, Cuba, agreed and noted that Cuba and Florida should not be concerned by the hurricane. However, that same day, a weather report received by a wireless station in Jupiter indicated that Florida would indeed experience "some or all of the storm."

Although the local newspapers such as The Palm Beach Post began acknowledging on September 15 that the hurricane may strike Florida, Gray remained entirely confident that the storm would not make landfall and instead predicted that winds would reach only . However, Gray still issued storm warnings from Miami to Titusville and also advised that "every precaution should be taken in case hurricane warnings should be found necessary on the east Florida coast." Early on September 16, a hurricane warning was issued from Miami to Daytona Beach, with Gray predicting that the storm would make landfall near Jupiter. The agency advised residents to enact precautions for the hurricane, citing the potential for strong winds and waves. Throughout the day, hurricane warnings were also posted for the west coast from Punta Rassa to Apalachicola, and after the storm recurved, hurricane warnings were extended along the east coast to Jacksonville.

Despite the initially perceived improbability of landfall in the days preceding the storm's passage, the West Palm Beach chapter of the American Red Cross began preparing for the storm. In West Palm Beach, food and thousands of candles, kerosene lamps, and boards were sold on September 16. A number of residents boarded up their homes and then secured their ornamental trees and plants. At the building then being used as the Palm Beach County Courthouse, approximately 500 people sought shelter inside. About 500 people in Lake Worth (modern-day Lake Worth Beach) were sheltered inside the Gulf Stream Hotel during the storm. In Jupiter, 20 people sought refuge in a grocery store, while 25 others stayed at a newly constructed elementary school. A number of African Americans took shelter in a school building in West Jupiter.

At the Lake Okeechobee region, Dr. William J. Buck, likely the only doctor between Pahokee and Moore Haven and also president of the Belle Glade town council and the founder of the town's American Legion post, was skeptical of the Weather Bureau's predictions of the storm missing South Florida. He and his legionnaires warned residents in the Lake Okeechobee region of the approaching cyclone. At South Bay, Frank Schuster made several car trips to save 211 people by transporting them to higher ground. The Seminoles at the Brighton Seminole Indian Reservation in Glades County evacuated to higher ground after observing retreating wildlife. A reverend from the city of Okeechobee noted that the traffic leaving the Lake Okeechobee area made the highways resemble "a one way street" on September 15 and September 16. Hours before the storm made landfall, many in the communities surrounding Lake Okeechobee either crowded into a house or evacuated to the building they believed was securest, such as the Belle Glade Hotel, the Glades Hotel, and Henry Martin's store in Belle Glade, with the Glades Hotel sheltering 20 people and the Belle Glade Hotel having nearly 150 refugees.

Along the west coast of Florida, shipments leaving Fort Myers were temporarily discontinued, while the United States Coast Guard moved several vessels into the port. Three of the yacht basins in St. Petersburg were nearly emptied of vessels after their owners moved them to land.

Impact

Strong winds struck southern Florida as the hurricane moved ashore, with winds estimated to have exceeded  in Lake Worth, Palm Beach, and West Palm Beach. In Miami, well south of where the storm struck, wind gusts reached , and farther south, Key West reported sustained winds of only .

The National Oceanic and Atmospheric Administration estimates that the hurricane caused approximately $25 million in damage. However, an impact survey conducted by Judge E. B. Donnell's committee yielded a damage estimate of almost $33.9 million, which the American Red Cross regarded as conservative because it does not account for "damage to sea walls, docks, bridges, crops, highways, farm machinery, house furnishings, etc." It is estimated if a similar storm struck in the year 2010, the hurricane would cause nearly $35.3 billion in damage.

Because of the hurricane warnings, the number of lives lost in the coastal Palm Beach County reached only 26. However, it is estimated that the hurricane caused at least 2,500 deaths and possibly as many as 3,000, primarily in the areas surrounding Lake Okeechobee. Migrant farm workers accounted for around 75% of the fatalities, making identification of both the deceased and missing bodies very difficult. Consequently, an accurate count of the dead is not possible. The American Red Cross estimated the number of fatalities at 1,836, which remained the official count used by the National Weather Service for several decades. However, the official mainland United States fatality count was revised to "at least" 2,500 in 2003, making the Okeechobee hurricane the second-deadliest natural disaster in the contiguous United States, behind the 1900 Galveston hurricane. This revision occurred because of the burial sites at Port Mayaca, Woodlawn Cemetery, and the pauper's cemetery in West Palm Beach collectively containing 2,343 bodies and a 1958 letter by Belle Glade pioneer and storm survivor Lawrence E. Will stating his belief that the hurricane killed about 2,500 people. 

In addition to the human fatalities, 1,278 livestock and 47,389 poultry were killed, respectively. Agriculture was impacted significantly, with the storm destroying what may have been the largest "citrus crop in the history of the industry". Approximately 6% of oranges and 18% of grapefruit were ruined, respectively. Harvesting the remaining crops was delayed until mid-October due to inundated groves. Communications also suffered severely. Throughout the state, 32,000 households were left without telephone service and 400 poles were broken and about 2,500 others leaning. Then-Governor of Florida John W. Martin estimated that 15,000 families were left homeless in Palm Beach County alone. Additionally, about 11,500 families would need to be "re-established", according to Governor Martin. The American Red Cross official disaster report assessed that the storm damaged or demolished about 32,400 strucutres in Florida.

Dade and Broward counties

In Miami, sustained winds reached , generally confining damage to awnings, plate-glass windows, trees, and vegetation, while interrupting electrical and telegraph services. Heavy rainfall damaged some homes and offices and left some streets in southern Miami impassable.

The Florida East Coast Railway Station in Hallandale Beach sustained almost complete destruction. Nearby, winds damaged windows and roofs in Fort Lauderdale and Hollywood, but caused minor impact overall. In the former, the storm downed power lines, telephone wires, and trees, and destroyed car garages, while also deroofing some buildings. Storm surge and abnormally high tides inundated portions of coastal roads in the vicinity of Las Olas Boulevard and left sand on the road along the coast to the north of Fort Lauderdale, though little damage occurred to the roadways themselves. Furthermore, the hurricane killed two people in the city. In Pompano Beach, the Pompano Theater suffered severe damage, while Kester Building, a drug store, and a grocery store experienced impact but to a lesser extent. Effects from the storm in Deerfield Beach resulted in the demolition of nearly all small frame houses, the post office, and an entire business block, while several citizens estimated that the hurricane destroyed about half of all homes. Strong winds also blew a freight train off its tracks. An eight-year-old boy drowned in a ditch near where his family sought refugee, while 51 additional people suffered injuries throughout Broward County.

Coastal Palm Beach County

Boca Raton to Lake Worth
In Boca Raton, longtime resident and husband of former mayor Jones Cleveland "J.C." Mitchell, Floy Mitchell, recalled that almost all buildings suffered some degree of damage, with nearly a third of the structures demolished. A damage report in The Palm Beach Post noted 32 damaged homes, 25 severely damaged businesses, and 4 destroyed businesses. At the Cloister Inn, the storm shattered windows and damaged the roof. Across the street from the hotel, winds tossed 32 freight cars owned by Florida East Coast Railway into a nearby ditch. A short distance to the north, a warehouse and a building occupied by a restaurant and a store were flattened. One death occurred in Boca Raton. At the Japanese community known as Yamato, the hurricane destroyed several frame homes and severely damaged a store. In Delray Beach, four churches suffered major damage and the Alta Repp and Seacrest hotels both lost a portion of their roof. Impacts from the storm left 277 homes destroyed and 750 other dwellings impaired, rendering about 350 families homeless. Additionally, 77 workplaces sustained damage and 19 others suffered destruction, including an ice plant, a dry cleaner, a mill works plant, and businesses adjacent to the Masonic Temple. The bridge across the Intracoastal Waterway remained mostly intact and became the only passable bridge between Delray Beach and West Palm Beach. The storm left four fatalities and just over $1 million in damage. One death occurred when a falling chimney struck a woman, while another person died when his house collapsed. A report compiled by The Palm Beach Post on September 17 noted that "several others, mostly negroes, were killed", but listed only one death for Delray Beach on September 18.

The roof of an auditorium at a high school in Boynton Beach collapsed, injuring 15 people seeking shelter inside the building. First United Methodist Church and its records were destroyed. A total of 18 businesses suffered complete destruction and 34 others received damage, while the storm also destroyed 46 dwellings and impaired 255 others. Additionally, the bridge crossing the Intracoastal Waterway moved upward by almost  after currents pushed two barges under the structure. Damage in Boynton Beach totaled approximately $1 million. In Lantana, all houses sustained major damage, while the Florida East Coast Railway Station was destroyed. The bridge crossing the Intracoastal Waterway fell off its turntable and twisted sideways into the water, while the approaches and tresses were wrecked. One death occurred in the city after a man suffered from exposure and succumbed to his condition on September 27.

Along the coast between Delray Beach and Briny Breezes, only minor washouts occurred, while a few homes suffered slight damage in the latter. However, Riddle Engineering president Karl Riddle described the area north of Briny Breezes to just south of the Lake Worth Casino as "completely washed away". In South Palm Beach, the Mirimar Inn was nearly destroyed, with its roof torn off and blown into nearby houses. A damage survey by The Palm Beach Post indicated that the structure "bore evidences that it might defy repairs". The city of Greenacres, incorporated only two years earlier, experienced near-complete destruction from a hurricane in 1926 and suffered a similar fate in this storm, with almost all buildings substantially damaged. Additionally, two deaths occurred in the city.

In Lake Worth, a damage survey shortly after the storm indicated that the hurricane destroyed 600 homes and damaged 1,500 other dwellings, leaving about 700 people homeless. Overall, less than 10% of homes escaped damage. Approximately 50 businesses were wrecked and 200 others received damage – roughly 75% of buildings in the business district. Among the buildings entirely demolished included a sporting goods store, St. Andrew's Episcopal Church, and First Presbyterian Church. The roof and most of the walls of the Oakley Theater collapsed, leaving the structure almost completely destroyed. Other severely damaged buildings in the city included the Scottish Rites Cathedral, the Masonic Temple, a hotel, a car dealership, an investment company, the auditorium at Lake Worth Community High School, and the publishing plant for The Lake Worth Leader newspaper.

City hall also sustained major damage. The exterior wall at the northwest corner, north tower, and bay on the northeastern side of the building each collapsed. The extensive impact on the structure left Lake Worth without a functional city government building. Consequently, the Lauriston building became a temporary city hall, even though the structure itself suffered severe roof and water damage. Damage in Lake Worth reached approximately $4 million, with about $400,000 in damage to city properties, excluding public schools. Further, the storm indirectly killed three people in Lake Worth, two from illnesses related to exposure to the storm; the other occurred due to apoplexy, blamed on excessive exertion in the aftermath of the hurricane.

West Palm Beach to Jupiter

In the week leading up to the hurricane, West Palm Beach observed  of precipitation, at least  of which fell during the storm. Among the buildings obliterated included a furniture store, pharmacy, warehouse, hotel, school, and ironworks, most of those being wooden-frame structures, while the few concrete-built structures remained standing. Only one business escaped serious damage on Clematis Street, the main commercial thoroughfare of West Palm Beach. Further, winds deroofed many other structures. All theaters in the city sustained major damage or destruction. The Kettler Theater suffered severe damage totaling about $125,000, while the Stanley experienced a similar fate, but quickly reopened by October. Additionally, only the walls of the Flamingo withstood the storm. Skylights at the county courthouse shattered, causing rainwater to flood the Criminal Court of Record rooms. Similarly, winds also broke a skylight at city hall, leading to damage to bookkeeper records. The cyclone partially demolished the hospital, which consequently led to the Pennsylvania Hotel becoming a temporary hospital. However, the hotel itself sustained damage after the chimney crashed through 14 floors, causing about $60,000 in damage. The fire station also collapsed, although the fire bell remained intact.

The storm reduced First Street (known now as Banyan Boulevard), then considered the auto row of West Palm Beach, to "a mass of debris", according to The New York Times. Only two buildings remained standing on the north side of the street between Dixie Highway and Olive Avenue, owing to the frail construction of the business buildings in that section of the city. The roof and equipment in The Palm Beach Post building suffered damage after the chimney fell. However, The Palm Beach Post managed to publish a newspaper on that day. Additionally, the storm partly demolished the Palm Beach Times building, causing the company's machines to be damaged by rain. Despite the damage, the Palm Beach Times also printed a short edition on the afternoon of September 17. The Central Farmers Trust Company, the only bank in the city, lost its roof and subsequently flooded. The Comeau Building suffered severe damage to its roof tiles; they were subsequently replaced. Prior to the storm, the American Legion building was designated as the headquarters for the Red Cross, but the building received major damage, forcing the Red Cross to set up its relief post at another building. At Palm Beach High School, then located where the Dreyfoos School of the Arts stands today, the clock tower collapsed. Most buildings at Saint Ann's Catholic Church lost their roofs, including the rectory and school facilities, while the storm destroyed the Bradley Hall Towers. Rainfall entering the buildings damaged furniture, plastering, and vestments. Flamingo Park was among the worst hit areas of the city. Many homes suffered "untold damage", as noted by The Palm Beach Post, while a shopping center on Lake Avenue experienced near-complete destruction. In contrast, the El Cid and Northwood neighborhoods reported mostly minor impact. In Vedado, fallen pine trees blocked many streets. At Bacon Park, the area west of Parker Avenue became desolate. The storm destroyed the L. Van Son House, proclaimed by The Palm Beach Post as "one of the most unusual landmarks".

In the African American section of the city, where most dwellings were built of discarded material, the hurricane damaged many homes. On one street, only two houses retained their walls or roof. Witnesses reported walls and cars cartwheeling down the streets. During the storm, about 100 people ran to a trash incinerator, a concrete-reinforced building. A few of the local black churches suffered significant damage. Tabernacle Missionary Baptist Church lost many bricks on its front façade and much of the metal grillwork around the entrances, while the building itself was deroofed. The cyclone demolished Payne Chapel AME Church, then located at Banyan Boulevard and Tamarind Avenue. St. Patrick's Catholic Church received about $40,000 in damage. Waves washed up mounds of sand and debris across Banyan Boulevard, Clematis Street, and Datura Street, to Olive Avenue, leaving streets "shoulder-deep in debris. The suffering throughout was beyond words.", according to county coroner T. M. Rickards. Overall, the hurricane obliterated 1,711 homes and damaged 6,369 others, rendering about 2,100 families homeless. Furthermore, the effects of the storm destroyed 268 businesses and impacted 490 others. Damage throughout West Palm Beach totaled just under $13.8 million and eleven deaths occurred.

Likewise, the cyclone also devastated Palm Beach. A few buildings constructed by Henry Flagler and his workers, such as The Breakers, the Royal Poinciana Hotel, and Whitehall suffered damage. The Breakers lost approximately 60% of its roof but sustained no other impact. At the Royal Poinciana Hotel, approximately 1,400 rooms experienced some degree of damage. Additionally, the storm almost completely destroyed the hotel's botanical garden, which contained hundreds of exotic trees and plants. The golf club suffered severe roof damage, while water ranging from several inches to several feet above ground inundated the golf course. Between The Breakers and the Royal Poinciana Hotel, strong winds toppled many Australian pine trees along the pathway linking the two hotels. These hotels, both owned by the Florida East Coast Hotel Company, recorded damage totaling more than $1.5 million. Whitehall staff reported damage to furnishings, windows, and its roof.

Waves inundated and swept away the foliage and trees at the house of J. Leonard Replogle. Edward T. Stotesbury's estate, El Mirasol, suffered severe damage and looked like "a forest at the front during the war", according to The New York Times. Rodman Wanamaker's house, known as "La Querida" and later the "Winter White House" during the presidency of John F. Kennedy, sustained heavy damage during the storm. The Alba (later the Biltmore), Billows, Palm Beach, and Royal Daneli hotels all suffered water damage, while the Alba Hotel was also deroofed. Nearby, the Rainbow Pier only received structural damage to its railings, though the pier office was blown away. At Worth Avenue, large waves washed boats ashore, some of which knocked over trees, while the storm also damaged stores. Approaches to the bridges at Southern Boulevard and Okeechobee Boulevard (Royal Park Bridge) were washed out. The Florida East Coast Bridge lost its railing, but remained partially open to traffic. Judge Donnell's report indicated that approximately 1,500 houses and 500 businesses in Palm Beach suffered structural impacts, with damage totaling around $10 million. However, mayor Barclay Harding Warburton I estimated that the storm damaged 610 buildings, 60 residences, and 10 hotels, while placing the damage total at a lesser figure of roughly $2.21 million, with $1 million being incurred at Ocean Boulevard.

Offshore Palm Beach, two  Coast Guard cutters from Fernandina Beach, 188 and 230, encountered rough seas generated by the hurricane. Their skippers and crews painstakingly moved the ships into Lake Worth through an inlet.

Heavy rainfall in Westgate rendered Okeechobee Road impassable. In Riviera Beach, the storm destroyed 500 homes and impacted another 1,000, while the cyclone also demolished approximately 100 workplaces and damaged 50 others. Overall, damage in Riviera Beach reached approximately $750,000. The bridge linking Riviera Beach to Singer Island across the Intracoastal Waterway was partly destroyed. Kelsey City, now known as Lake Park, reported impact similar to that which occurred in Rivieria Beach, with 200 homes completely wrecked and 300 others damaged. Additionally, a total of 75 businesses were destroyed and an equal number suffered some degree of impact. The storm destroyed city hall, which many residents had sought refuge inside. However, the building was later repaired and has been listed on the National Register of Historic Places since 1981. The gymnasium and auditorium collapsed. The cost of damage in Kelsey City totaled $1 million.

In Jupiter, the hurricane obliterated 50 dwellings and impacted 425 others. Furthermore, a total of six businesses were demolished and thirteen others suffered damage. Storm surge and tides left waist-deep water in some areas and swept away a pavilion, some boathouses, and a boat at the boathouse near the Florida East Coast Railroad bridge. Nearby, the Loxahatchee River reached  at the railroad trestle. In addition to damaging homes and businesses, strong winds also toppled telephone poles, overturned cars, and knocked over 17 windmills at the Pennock Plantation. Two  towers fell over at the Naval Radio Station Jupiter Inlet. The lighthouse keeper, Captain Seabrook, and his son, Franklin, worked to keep the light on during the storm after the electricity went out. After the generator failed to work, they hand-cranked the light's mantle. Nearby, the storm destroyed the building formerly used as a Weather Bureau Office. Nearby, six people died after a house collapsed, while six other fatalities occurred west of Jupiter after the storm demolished a school that people had sought shelter in. Damage in Jupiter totaled approximately $900,000.

Lake Okeechobee region 

Inland, the cyclone wreaked much more widespread destruction along the southeast and north coasts of Lake Okeechobee. Although residents received warnings earlier in the day to evacuate from low-lying areas, the hurricane did not arrive on schedule and many people thought it had missed and returned to their homes. Heavy rainfall in the weeks prior to September 10 caused the lake to rise  and filled nearby canals and ditches. Additionally, precipitation from the hurricane itself resulted in the level of Lake Okeechobee increasing further. When the worst of the storm crossed the lake, intense winds caused a storm surge to breach the small dikes that had been built at the south end of the lake. Water also carried survivors and victims into the Everglades, where many of the bodies were never recovered. In addition to extensive structural impacts and loss of life, agriculture also received significant losses, with virtually all crops destroyed and over 150 tractors damaged.

On Kreamer Island, many residents received information about the storm when it was too late to evacuate. In some homes, 20–30 people sought shelter inside and later stood on tables and chairs to remain above the water. Despite this, only one person drowned on the island. Likewise, residents of Torry Island also did not have ample time to prepare for the storm. They attempted to evacuate, but with the causeway already inundated, 23 people sought refuge inside a packinghouse. Floodwaters entered the building, forcing the occupants into the rafters. However, the building was eventually pushed into a nearby canal. Although 10 of the occupants drowned, some of the others survived by clinging to a barge or treetops, while one woman tied herself to a telegraph pole. On Ritta Island, a number of people who successfully climbed to the roof of their houses died after being struck by trees or bit by water moccasins.

Belle Glade suffered the most deaths of any city by far, with 611 fatalities confirmed. At the Glades Hotel, floodwaters entered the lobby and rose so rapidly that the last two people to reach the second floor nearly drowned in the stairwell, although the structure remained the only building in the city left intact. Similarly, the first floor of the Belle Glade Hotel also flooded, forcing the occupants up to the second floor, who later became exposed to the wind and rain after the roof blew off. Nearby, a building containing a restaurant, a furniture store, and a drugstore was deroofed; the 20 to 30 occupants seeking shelter there fled to the Glades Hotel. Farther east, water reached  in height at the Everglades Experiment Station. The crops grown at the station, generally used for scientific experiments, were completely ruined. There, the anemometer observed a sustained wind speed of  before being destroyed. Winds deroofed all buildings at the station except two bungalows, one of which sheltered 40 people, and the service house for the greenhouse. Additionally, the storm destroyed a garage, two labor cabins, and a five-room bungalow, as well as a portion of the greenhouse.

The city of Pahokee, mostly situated atop a ridge, resembled an island due to surrounding high water. Low-lying areas quickly flooded, with several rows of homes swept away, including at Bacom Point and areas near the Pelican River. Many of the deaths in the city occurred when the storm surge that had moved up the river retreated. At the height of the storm, dwellings on the ridge began washing away, with nothing remaining on the west side of the ridge. Overall, approximately 75% of buildings and homes in the city were destroyed, with the bank and schoolhouse being "probably the only two buildings left standing in any substantial condition." A total of 153 deaths were confirmed in Pahokee. Newspapers such as The Palm Beach Times initially reported about 450 deaths at Pelican Bay, located between Belle Glade and Pahokee. However, Everglades News editor Howard Sharp noted that the death toll was "not understandable to the persons familiar with the region" and that "there is no 'village of Pelican Bay'". One death occurred in the former, caused by a man who experienced "heart trouble" following the destruction of his home.

In South Bay, several buildings lost their roofs and a survey by the American Red Cross described the town as "wiped out". The structures not suffering any damage floated away. Survivors noted that many boats and barges in the canal were "resting at all angles.", with some capsized or disabled. Water also swept many homes to the banks of the canal, while broken lumber littered the streets. Debris such as the remains of custard apple trees, twisted metal roofing, and wood were piled against the bridges. At least 160 fatalities occurred in the city, while the American Red Cross indicated 247 deaths. Throughout the 1920s, Okeelanta suffered several floods and muck fires. Finally, the town was flooded severely during the storm and was subsequently abandoned. Bean City was nearly completely destroyed during the hurricane; only one home remained standing and at least a dozen people perished, although founder Arthur Wells eventually rebuilt the city. Sebring Farms was reduced to piles of rubble, with only four tall royal palm trees left standing, while just six people in the town survived. In Miami Locks (today known as Lake Harbor), only the hotel withstood the hurricane. Ninety-nine people died in that town, as did many animals, whose carcasses came to rest on the canal banks. In Chosen, only two people managed to escape a house that sheltered nineteen people. At Henry Martin's store, the building lost its roof during the storm, forcing the occupants to move into the restroom. A total of 23 people died in Chosen as a result of the hurricane.

As the rear eyewall passed over the area, the wave action in Lake Okeechobee reversed itself, breaking the dikes along the north shore and causing a similar but less devastating flood. Along Route 98, then known as Conner's Highway, water swept the bridge crossing the Onosohatchee River
In Okeechobee County, storm surge severely impacted or destroyed homes near the shore of the lake, including in the city of Okeechobee, where residences also suffered significant damage due to winds of at least . However, brick and concrete-structured dwellings received little damage. A number of three-story business buildings collapsed during the storm. Almost all roads were left impassable, while communications were nearly wiped out. Overall, the cyclone caused at least 27 deaths in Okeechobee County. Along the southwestern shore of Lake Okeechobee, the towns of Clewiston and Moore Haven also flooded, but much of the damage to houses occurred due to strong winds. In the former, the railroad tracks were ripped and reduced to "a twisted ribbon of steel".

Floodwaters persisted for several weeks, greatly impeding attempts to clean up the devastation. On October 23, over five weeks after the storm, Florida National Guard Major B. M. Atkinson reported  of standing-water along the side of the roads to Belle Glade, Okeechobee, and South Bay.

Elsewhere

In Martin County, a bridge connecting Stuart and Palm City was severely damaged and closed to traffic as a result. A temporary ferry service provided transportation across the St. Lucie River until repairs to the bridge were completed in the summer of 1929. One fatality occurred in Stuart. Plans to build a Hollywood-esque city featuring a movie studio called Picture City fell through following the 1928 hurricane and subsequent economic collapse. The storm left only two homes standing in the African-American section of Indiantown and tore off a large portion of the roof of the Seaboard Air Line station. Throughout Martin County, five deaths and about $4 million in damage occurred, primarily to citrus crops. In Fort Pierce, the worst impacts occurred in the waterfront areas, where the hurricane destroyed a warehouse, fish houses, docks, and a bridge across the Indian River, while unroofing several other buildings. Damage in the city totaled about $150,000. High winds deroofed some buildings in Vero Beach, including businesses and the senior high school, while some roofs also suffered damage in Sebastian. The storm flooded roads and toppled communication lines in Fellsmere. The city also experienced a loss of about 85% of its crops.

In the interior areas of Central and North Florida, impact was generally confined to agricultural losses, particularly citrus, though some wind damage occurred to structures. Between Sebring and Lake Wales, the storm toppled 200 telephone poles, while 60 others fell between Bartow and Mulberry. In the former, business building windows shattered and signs toppled, while several roofs and chimneys also suffered damage. One death was reported in Bartow. Winds gusting up to  lashed Lakeland, uprooting many trees. Several buildings also sustained damage, including the hospital and a number of businesses. At Florida Southern College (FSC), the north side of the gymnasium collapsed while other buildings also received damage, albeit to a lesser degree. The trees in the citrus grove surrounding FSC lost much of their fruit. Overall, Lakeland suffered about $50,000 in damage. Throughout Polk County, 10% of oranges and about 50% of grapefruit were lost, respectively, with the vast majority of groves losing 60% to 75% of grapefruit.

Property damage was slight in Fort Myers, limited mostly to scores of small boats and fishing smacks along the waterfront. The Cuban schooner Isabel Alvado sank offshore Boca Grande. The crew, composed of immigrants, were rescued by the Coast Guard and later deported. Winds and rain in Tampa forced nearly all cigar factories to close due to too much moisture entering the buildings. In St. Petersburg, a car garage lost a large section of its roof. Other impacts mainly included some tree branches falling onto electrical wires. Along the Gulf Coast of Florida, telephone lines were reported down as far north as between Brooksville and Dade City. Offshore, the fishing smack Wallace A. McDonnell was beached near Piney Point, though all of the crew survived.

In Orlando, the impact on properties was described as slight. Light damage to citrus was reported in Lake and Orange counties, with only about 10% of the crop lost in the former. The storm caused one death in Orange City. The Halifax River crested at a then-record height, inundating Beach Street, although no coastal flood damage occurred. In Jacksonville Beach, the hurricane deroofed several homes, destroyed the pier, and wrecked a roller coaster.

Aftermath

In the immediate aftermath of the storm, available cots and blankets were set up in the churches, courthouses, public buildings, schools, warehouses, and other buildings that would be designated as a shelter. The Gulf Stream Hotel in Lake Worth was converted into a hospital. A total of 1,274 people slept in shelters in West Palm Beach on September 17, which more than doubled to 2,732 people on the following night, before peaking at over 5,500 people on September 20. Roughly the same number of displaced persons stayed at private dwellings. With the need for additional cots and blankets, a request for them was sent to the United States Army, which promptly sent 2,000 cots and 1,000 blankets from Fort McPherson in Georgia to relief centers in Belle Glade, Boynton Beach, Canal Point, Jupiter, Kelsey City, Pahokee, Riviera Beach, and West Palm Beach. Many other cots and blankets were later transported to the area. A number of winter residents allowed their homes to be used as shelters.
 
Dr. W. A. Claxton, chief of the Miami Department of Public Welfare, requested antitoxin, typhoid serum, and at least 200 tetanus serums. The Florida Department of Health granted the request. Of the inoculations distributed, there were 10,349 for typhoid, 1,025 for smallpox, and 337 for tetanus. A health bulletin issued on September 28 indicated that due to vaccinations and other efforts by state and local health departments, there was "no outbreak of typhoid, malaria, influenza, or any other communicable diseases, and we do no anticipate any." Overall, 210 doctors and 78 nurses worked in the disaster area, each accumulating more than 50 hours of service. 

Many other individuals and organizations contributed to relief efforts. A group of men with trucks were dispatched northward from Miami to clear trees and other debris from the roads. They worked quickly enough to reach West Palm Beach by the night of September 17. Early on September 18, a train leaving Miami carried 20 doctors and 20 nurses to West Palm Beach. At least 100 people were brought to Miami for medical treatment. In addition to trains, supplies were transported to Palm Beach County by 93 vehicles making an average of 553 trips per day and 51 trucks recording a mean of 206 trips daily. Thirty-eight motor boats and 4 airplanes also delivered supplies. On September 23, then-Governor of Georgia Lamartine Griffin Hardman offered aid to Florida, urging his state to assist "in every possible way." On November 18, every Catholic church in the United States contributed a portion of their offering, with $84,200 in aid given to Florida and Puerto Rico. Masonic lodges throughout the United States collectively donated more than $107,000.

Colonel E. R. Bradley, one of the wealthiest residents of Palm Beach and owner of a casino in the town, donated $10,000. J. P. Morgan gave also $10,000 to the Red Cross. Then-gubernatorial candidate Doyle E. Carlton contributed $10,000 on September 20 after surveying the damage. A creamery in West Palm Beach quickly distributed 1,400 gallons of milk. In Miami, WQAM hosted a telethon on September 22, which also included live entertainment from a Shriners band at a park amphitheater. The event collected about $1,000 for the victims of the storm. The city of Miami also donated 2 tanks of chlorine, 20 barrels of disinfectant, 24 lanterns, and 5,000 paper cups. City council members of San Francisco, which suffered from a devastating earthquake in 1906, agreed to donate $10,000 to South Florida without discussion. Issaquena County, Mississippi, among the most ravaged by a Great Mississippi Flood of 1927, also contributed money. Although many railroad stations south of Kelsey City were damaged, train service was restored on the morning of September 17. Railroad companies provided free fare to storm victims until October 4, a service used by 1,427 people. After that day, the Red Cross paid for the transportation of people who were destitute.

Looting became a serious issue in the aftermath of the storm, especially in Palm Beach and West Palm Beach. In the latter, Police Chief Frank H. Matthews ordered a sunset-to-sunrise curfew, unless a person had a pass or permit signed by Matthews or his assistant, or if "an extreme emergency demands it". The Red Cross would also issued passes. Day and night, militia members and personnel of 124th Infantry Regiment of the Florida Army National Guard patrols the streets of West Palm Beach. On September 19, Governor Martin summoned all Florida National Guard members to serve in other functions as well as patrolling against looting. Several mansions in Palm Beach were robbed, including very expensive paintings stolen at one home. Martial law was declared on September 19, but rescinded the following day. Checkpoints were ordered by Palm Beach County Sheriff Robert C. Baker along the main highways at Lake Worth and Jupiter.

At the south shore Lake Okeechobee communities, Dr. Buck took charge. Because no vehicles were operable, roads flooded, and minimal food and water supplies, Buck ordered nearly 100 women and children to walk to West Palm Beach – a distance of  – seen as their best chance for survival. After several miles, the women and children were eventually met by ambulances from West Palm Beach. Dr. Buck also delegated fellow American Legionnaires and recruited other volunteers to clear the roads in the vicinity of Lake Okeechobee. By the afternoon of September 20, the roads were cleared from Belle Glade to the agricultural station, Chosen, and South Bay. Dr. Buck also ordered some men to break into the ice house, which would be a source of freshwater.

Governor John W. Martin, along with Florida Attorney General Fred Henry Davis, chief engineer Fred C. Elliott, and Florida Adjutant General Vivian B. Collins, assessed the disaster area in the communities along Lake Okeechobee beginning on September 22. After the conclusion of the tour, Martin telegraphed every mayor in Florida to aid the victims of the storm and apologized for not issuing that appeal sooner. Martin also described the scene:

With nearly 3,000 telephone poles damaged or snapped and 32,000 service outages, Southern Bell and AT&T quickly began work on restoring telephone service, sending workers from their centers in Atlanta and Jacksonville, respectively. The companies shipped about 225 tons of copper wire and 20 rail cars full of poles and switchboards. The Southern Bell office in Delray Beach was nearly destroyed, causing workers to move the service center to a nearby building. By the morning of September 18, water service was restored in the central sections of West Palm Beach and was expected to expand to other areas of the city quickly.

In Palm Beach, about fifty men shoveled sand off Ocean Boulevard and cut down damaged palm trees with crosscut saws. On September 19, then-Mayor of West Palm Beach Vincent Oaksmith issued a "no work, no food" order, effectively stating that all able-bodied men should work toward relief efforts. The Delray Beach City Council issued a similar order. Initially, rebuilding in West Palm Beach was slow. City Manager A. E. Parker issued a public notice that stated "Because of the grave emergency now existing and the great need for shelter, it has not been deemed wise to insist upon building permits for necessary repairs." Many severely damaged buildings were declared "public menaces" and condemned for demolition, effective on October 23. On September 20, the West Palm Beach City Commission held a special session that allowed the City Treasurer to authorize an in advance requisition payment of $50,000 to the Red Cross. Also on the agenda was an anti-price gauging measure, which would fine individuals up to $500 and imprison them for a maximum of 30 days if they sold items above the pre-September 16 price.

In the aftermath of the hurricane in coastal Florida, it became apparent that well-constructed buildings with shutters had suffered practically no damage from winds that caused serious structural problems to lesser buildings. Buildings with well-constructed frames, and those made of steel, concrete, brick, or stone were largely immune to the winds, and the use of shutters prevented damage to windows and the interior of the buildings. Coming on the heels of the 1926 Miami hurricane where a similar pattern had been noticed, one lasting result of the 1928 storm was improved building codes.

American Red Cross
A total of 3,390 American Red Cross volunteers across the United States assisted with relief efforts. Overall, individual contributions to the organization reached almost $5.9 million, while the American Red Cross itself spent about $50,000 of its own funds on relief efforts. More than $1.1 million in contributions came from the state of New York alone, with many donations to the organization occurring after New York City mayor Jimmy Walker and President Calvin Coolidge bought a full-page advertisement in The New York Times. American Red Cross expenditures included about $1.3 million for building and repairs, $346,300 for household goods, $157,300 for clothing, $137,000 for food, $121,200 for agricultural supplies and equipment, $115,500 for family aid and service registration, $115,000 for field expenses, $83,200 for general tool and equipment expenses, $71,800 for medical services, $66,800 for grants to local chapters, $60,300 for relief camps, $45,900 for rescue work, $39,800 for boarding and lodging of storm victims, $19,900 for other miscellaneous expenses, $11,000 for the transportation of storm victims, and $5,000 for the Junior Red Cross.

Many chapters of the American Red Cross in Florida took in refugees, donated goods and supplies, or otherwise provided assistance to storm victims, including the cities of Arcadia, Fort Myers, Haines City, Jacksonville, Sarasota, Sebring, St. Petersburg, Tampa, and Winter Haven, as well as Dade (today Miami-Dade), Indian River, Polk, St. Lucie, and Volusia counties. In Dade County, the Miami Red Cross Citizens Relief Committee was established. It provided aid for victims of the storm by transporting "hundreds of loaves of bread, gallons of milk, pounds of coffee and sugar, blankets, cots, and medical supplies."

In collaboration with the Extension Division of the United States Department of Agriculture, the American Red Cross provided seeds, fertilizer, feed, and gasoline and oil for farmers suffering severe losses. About 150 Fordson tractors were disabled by water damage to their ignitions or other parts. The Ford Motor Company, the manufacturer of the tractors, sent two trucks of parts and two mechanical experts from their plant in Jacksonville. Additionally, the Palm Beach County Farm Loan Fund, which had a fund of approximately $100,000, allowed farmers to be eligible for $300 loans with at a 5% interest rate. The American Red Cross established 22 canteens and emergency feeding centers. The organization provided repair services to 3,624 structures and work crews shifted 81 homes back to their foundations, while also anchoring 704 dwellings to concrete foundation piers to mitigate damage in future strong wind events. After the shelters originally housing storm refugees all closed by October 6, the American Red Cross opened two tent cities for those who remained homeless after the storm, with the United States Army providing the tents. A total of 10,172 families registered and applied for aid with the American Red Cross by October 28, about two-thirds of whom resided in Palm Beach County. The national American Red Cross organization withdrew from the disaster area on March 1, 1929, and returned relief responsibilities back to local chapters.

The American Red Cross was criticized for claims of skimping on aid given to some people and even racial discrimination. Some large families reportedly received as little as $2. In Delray Beach, a woman who completely lost her home said she was given only "a few old pieces of clothes and a few cans of tomatoes and potted meat and a small can of milk for myself and kids." Grace Campbell, a chair of a workers committee, was quoted in The Chicago Defender stating that only 20% of relief was being dispersed to African Americans. Additionally, a rumor circulated, which even garnered sympathy from Governor Martin, that a black man named Levi Brown was eating ham in a mess tent and was struck in the head and shoulder with an ax by a Red Cross worker, told him "ham was not for niggers." Brown himself later admitted that he was actually assaulted with a meat cleaver in a restaurant. These claims of partiality were refuted by the American Red Cross, The Salvation Army, and Mary McLeod Bethune in a telegraph to the National Association for the Advancement of Colored People (NAACP). In fact, the American Red Cross had established a Colored Advisory Committee – given that many impacted by the disaster were people of color – composed of local volunteers who could provide relief without prejudice and investigate claims of discrimination relating to aid offered by the organization.

Burial of bodies 

The death toll was by far highest in the economically poor areas in the low-lying ground right around Lake Okeechobee, such as Belle Glade, Chosen, Miami Locks, Pahokee, and South Bay. Around 75% of the fatalities were among migrant farm workers, most of whom were African American. Many African American men who survived the storm were ordered at gunpoint to collect bodies. One man was shot for refusing to do so. Despite Prohibition laws at the time, those searching and collecting bodies received rations of bootleg whisky, which was provided by a local rum-runner. Pioneer Lawrence E. Will stated that "without the stimulated effect of the whiskey ration, it is doubtful if many would have the stamina to continue." The body collectors received gloves that were regularly disinfected. They would tie usually about half a dozen bodies together by the ankle and then load them onto trucks. After a truck departed, the men would then received their ration of whisky. This process continued day and night until October, while the search for bodies continued until November 1.

Due to racial segregation at the time, the coffins provided were used for the white victims, most of whom received a proper burial at Woodlawn Cemetery in West Palm Beach. The bodies of the African Americans victims and those whose race could not be identified were disposed of by other means. Some were burned in funeral pyres, while many were placed into mass graves, including about 1,600 in Port Mayaca, 674 at the pauper's cemetery, at least 22 in Miami Locks (now known as Lake Harbor), 28 in Ortona, and 22 in Sebring. There were also unconfirmed reports of bodies buried at Loxahatchee. After the burials were complete, West Palm Beach mayor Vincent Oaksmith proclaimed an hour of mourning on October 1 for those who died during the storm. A funeral service was hosted by several local clergymen and attended by about 3,000 people, including educator Mary McLeod Bethune. A memorial was placed at Woodlawn Cemetery in memory of the victims of the storm, but no such marker was placed at the pauper's cemetery.

During the next several decades, the mass African American burial site in West Palm Beach was largely forgotten by the public. The city later sold the property, which switched ownership multiple times over the years. In 1991, the property was owned by a private individual when the Sankofa Society conducted a blessing ceremony at the site, well-publicized by the local media. Around that time, Robert Hazard, a resident of West Palm Beach, established the Storm of '28 Memorial Park Coalition Inc. to fight for recognition of the black victims of the storm. In December 2000, the city of West Palm Beach purchased the land back for $180,000. Plans for the construction of a memorial began. The site was designated a U.S. National Register of Historic Places and a historical marker was added in 2003 during the 75th anniversary of the hurricane. The inequity has caused ongoing racial friction that still exists. The effects of the hurricane on black migrant workers is dramatized in Zora Neale Hurston's novel Their Eyes Were Watching God.

Economic aftermath
The Florida land boom was effectively ended by the hurricane. The region was pushed into economic turmoil even before the Wall Street Crash of 1929 and the initial stages of the Great Depression. Potential investors and buyers were skeptical about purchasing land in the area. As a result, property values plummeted. In West Palm Beach, for example, real estates costs dropped 53 percent to $41.6 million (1930 USD) between 1929 and 1930 and further to only $18.2 million (1935 USD) by 1935. Prior to the Wall Street Crash of 1929, several hotels in the area declared bankruptcy, attempted to find new investors, or changed names and management. 

The arrival of the Mediterranean fruit flies in 1929 also contributed to the nearly complete destruction of tourism and citrus in South Florida – two vital economic industries in the region. The federal and state government would spend approximately $7 million (1929 USD) in eradication efforts. There were foreign and domestic bans on the importation of fruits and vegetables from Florida. Programs established by the New Deal and efforts by Florida governors in mid and late 1930s, particularly David Sholtz, brought relief to the economic slump, but the region remained in an abysmal financial state until the onslaught of American involvement in World War II.

Because of the collapsing economic boom and the publicity surrounding the corrupt real estate deals, the severity of the disaster in Southeast Florida was downplayed. The Tampa Tribune owner Peter O. Knight described the situation as "trivial". The Tampa Board of Trade sent a telegraph to the United States Chamber of Commerce in Washington, D.C., on September 17, informing them that the damage had been "exaggerated". The board even considered protesting news agencies that write "exaggerated" reports and warned that there would be requests for retraction. Knight was harshly criticized for marginalizing the disaster, with Palm Beach County Red Cross Chairman Howard Shelby responding with a telegraph stating, "If you serve as a spokesman for the entire state, won't you kindly make a personal visit here?", while the Okeechobee News called Knight "a jackass".

Herbert Hoover Dike

To prevent a recurrence of disasters such as the Okeechobee hurricane and the 1926 Miami hurricane, the Florida Legislature created the Okeechobee Flood Control District during its 1929 session, following a recommendation by U.S. Senator Duncan U. Fletcher, among other members of the state's congressional delegation. The Okeechobee Flood Control District authorized to cooperate with the U.S. Army Corps of Engineers in flood control undertakings. Proposals on other ways to prevent a recurrence of the 1926 and 1928 hurricanes were advanced, including "build[ing] a wall down there and keep the military there" in order to prevent further settlement in the area or constructing a dike.

In January 1929, Fred C. Elliott explained during a Congressional hearing that because no state funds were available and state law did not allow for the construction of a dike, Congress was petitioned for funding and authorization. Bror G. Dahlberg, Congressmen Herbert J. Drane and William J. Sears of Florida's 1st and 4th congressional districts respectively, Fred Henry Davis, former Congressman Walter F. Lineberger from California, and U.S. Senator Park Trammell of Florida also testified. Drane stated that he had attempted since 1924 to bring about flood control. After President Herbert Hoover's visit to the area in February 1929, the Corps drafted a new plan which provided for the construction of floodway channels, control gates, and major levees along Lake Okeechobee's shores. A long term system was designed for the purpose of flood control, water conservation, prevention of saltwater intrusion, and preservation of fish and wildlife populations. Congress approved the Rivers and Harbors Act of 1930, signed into law by President Hoover on July 3, 1930.

After the initial completion of the dike, Congress reported in 1943 that total expenditures reached at least $23 million (1943 USD), $19 million of which was for the original construction. The dike was expanded further after flooding during a series of intense hurricanes in the late 1940s, such as the 1947 Fort Lauderdale hurricane, as well as the passage of the Flood Control Act of 1948. The dike was complete in 1961. A ceremony held in Clewiston on January 12, 1961, included a speech from former President Herbert Hoover. Since its completion, the dike almost completely encloses the lake, except at Fisheating Creek – the mouth located in Glades County near Lakeport. There, the dike turns inland and parallels the creek on both sides for several miles, leaving Fisheating Creek as the only remaining free-flowing tributary of Lake Okeechobee.

Since at least the 1990s, concerns related to the dike's stability have grown in response to studies indicating long term problems with "piping" and erosion. Leaks have been reported after several heavy rain events. Proposed solutions to the dike's problems have included the construction of a seepage berm on the landward side of the dike, with the first stage costing approximately $67 million (2008 USD). Several refurbishment projects occurred throughout the years. From 2007 to 2016, the Army Corps of Engineers (USACE) spent $500 million (2016 USD) on improvements, then considered one of the most at risk of failing in the United States. In December 2016, the construction firm Treviicos added the remaining  of cutoff wall into the dike's most likely to fail sections. Overall, Treviicos inserted approximately  into the Hoover Dike by late 2022, effectively creating a dam inside a dam. That year, TCPalm noted that an USACE inspection just prior to Hurricane Nicole revealed that the dike "is safer today than it has ever been going into a storm".

See also

List of disasters in the United States by death toll
List of Florida hurricanes (1900–1949)
Effects of the 1947 Fort Lauderdale hurricane in Florida
1949 Florida hurricane
History of Palm Beach County, Florida

Notes

References
General
 
 
 
 
 
 
 
 
 
 
 

Specific

External links

hurricanescience.org – 1928– Okeechobee Hurricane
Palm Beach County Historical Society – The 1928 Hurricane
Videos:
Footage during and after the storm in Palm Beach
Heritage, Episode 10: Hurricane Of 1928
Storm Stories – 1928 Hurricane

1920s Atlantic hurricane seasons
1928 in Florida
Okeechobee Hurricane
Okeechobee Hurricane
Okeechobee Hurricane
Hurricane
Okeechobee Hurricane